Sistan-e Sofla (also Romanized as Sīstān-e Soflā; also known as Sissun, Sīstān, Sīstān-e Pāyin, and Sīsūn) is a village in Jolgah Rural District, in the Central District of Jahrom County, Fars Province, Iran. At the 2006 census, its population was 52, in 13 families.

References 

Populated places in Jahrom County